Emil Săndoi (born 1 March 1965) is a Romanian football manager and former player.

A centre-back, he was born in Craiova and debuted in Divizia A with hometown side Universitatea Craiova in 1983.

Săndoi made his debut for the Romania national team in 1987 against Greece, and was chosen in the 1990 FIFA World Cup squad.

Game interference
In a game between Chindia Târgoviște and Argeș in Romania's second division, Săndoi was standing on the side line as manager, and yet interfered in the match by tripping an opposition player.

International stats

Honours

Player
Universitatea Craiova
Divizia A: 1990–91
Cupa României: 1990–91, 1992–93

Coach
FC Universitatea Craiova
Cupa României runner-up: 1999–00

Pandurii Târgu Jiu
Divizia B: 2004–05

References

External links

1965 births
Living people
Sportspeople from Craiova
Romanian footballers
Association football defenders
CS Universitatea Craiova players
FC U Craiova 1948 players
Angers SCO players
FC Argeș Pitești players
1990 FIFA World Cup players
Romania international footballers
Liga I players
Romanian football managers
Liga I managers
FC U Craiova 1948 managers
FC Vaslui managers
CS Pandurii Târgu Jiu managers
CS Universitatea Craiova managers
CS Concordia Chiajna managers
FC Argeș Pitești managers
AFC Chindia Târgoviște managers
Romanian expatriate footballers
Romanian expatriate sportspeople in France
Expatriate footballers in France